True Sport is a Thai group of sport channels operated by cable and satellite pay-TV provider TrueVisions. True Sport channels are available exclusively on TrueVisions. The number of channels are depends on the package.

True Sport holds exclusive rights to broadcast Thai League T1, NFL, NBA as well as the tennis programmes from ATP Tour, WTA Tour and US Open. It also airs magazine shows from FIFA, ITTF and ATP.

True Sport channels

Current channels

True Sport 2
True Sport 2 originally launched as SuperSport. It was the extra sports channel along with SuperSport Gold. SuperSport replaced by UBC Super Sport 2: Action in November 2004. UBC Super Sport 2: Action airs WWE, fighting sports, Extreme sport, Water sports and Local sports.

On 1 August 2007, UBC Super Sport 2: Action has rebranded as True Sport 2. True Sport 2 now mainly airs Thai League T1 and other football related live coverage and programmes.

True Sport 5
True Sport 5 firstly launched on 1 August 2007 until it was replaced by pay-per-view True Sport Club Channels on 10 January 2009. True Sport 5 has relaunched to covers Golf.

True Sport 6
True Sport 6 originally launched as True Sport Extra 2 on 1 August 2007. It was using as extra channel for live coverage sports along with True Sport Extra 1. True Sport 6 replaced True Sport Extra 2 on 1 April 2010. It mainly broadcasts Boxing.

True Sport 7
True Sport 7 replaced Special Sports on 1 November 2012. It mainly airs Badminton, Volleyball and Snooker matches featuring Thai athletics.

True Sport HD

True Sport HD launched in May 2010. It was the first high-definition dedicated sport channel in Thailand. It mainly broadcasts NFL, NBA, Badminton and Snooker matches in HD format.

True Sport HD 2

True Sport HD 2 launched in 2012. It was broadcasting European football in high-definition format including Premier League, La Liga, Serie A, UEFA Champions League and UEFA Europa League. True Sport HD 2 also simulcasted the Premier League Content Service, a dedicated Premier League channel produced by Premier League Productions until TrueVisions lost its rights to broadcast Premier League.

True Sport HD 2 mainly airs Thai football competitions including Thai League T1, Thai FA Cup and Thai League Cup.

True Sport HD 3

True Sport HD 3 launched in 2013. It was serving as an extra channel for live coverages of various sport events.

True Sport HD 4

True Sport HD 4 originally launched as True Sport Extra 1 on 1 August 2007, was using as extra channel for live coverage of Premier League matches and later added rugby union matches from Setanta Sports Asia. It was rebranded as True Sport 8 in July 2013 then upgraded to HD broadcast channel True Sport HD 4 in August 2013. It simultaneously air Setanta Sports Asia and live football coverage when needs.

True Tennis HD

True Tennis HD launched as UBC Super Sport 4: Zoccer in 2004. It was aired programmes from football club channels including MUTV, LFC TV, Arsenal TV and Chelsea TV. True Sport 4 replaced UBC Super Sport 4: Zoccer on 1 August 2007. It was broadcasting golf from PGA Tour and tennis before converted to HD tennis-dedicated channel True Tennis HD. It airs tennis programmes mostly from ATP Tour, WTA Tour and US Open.

Defunct channels

True Sport Club Channels 
True Sport Club Channels are a set of football dedicated pay-per-view channels launched on 10 January 2009 replacing True Sport 5. It mainly broadcast Premier League matches of Big Four including magazine programmes from club channels and Premier League matches from another teams. True Sport Club Channel M broadcasts Manchester United, True Sport Club Channel L for Liverpool FC, True Sport Club Channel A for Arsenal and True Sport Club Channel C for Chelsea FC.

True Sport 1 
True Sport 1 originally launched as SuperSport Gold. It was the first 24 hours premium sport dedicated channel in Thailand. SuperSport Gold airs Premier League, Serie A, Bundesliga, NFL and tennis programmes. SuperSport Gold was replaced by UBC Super Sport 1 in November 2004.

On 1 August 2007, UBC Super Sport 1 was rebranded as True Sport 1. It was broadcasting English Premier League matches and the magazine programs from Premier League , live the best matches of football leagues such as La Liga, Serie A, UEFA Champions League, UEFA Europa League and UEFA Super Cup including FIFA Football Mundial and The Football Review until 2016.

In August 2016. True Sport 1 was broadcasting the rewind sports program including WTA Tour tennis, World Snooker and BWF Badminton along with FIFA Football Mundial and The Football Review show until 31 December 2016.

On 1 January 2017, True Sport 1 was broadcasting the schedules from True Sport HD (NBA, NFL, BWF Badminton, World Snooker etc.) switch live Thai League 2 (T2) football match until ceased on 8 June 2018.

True Sport 3 
True Sport 3 originally launched as UBC Super Sport 3: Plus in November 2004 to serve as an extra channel for live coverage sports event. On 1 August 2007, UBC Super Sport 3: Plus has replaced by True Sport 3. It broadcasts Extreme sports, Water sports, American sports including NFL and NBA also Motor sports until 31 December 2016.

On 1 January 2017, True Sport 3 was broadcasting the schedules from True Sport HD3 (BWF Badminton, World Snooker, motor sports etc.) switch live Thai League 2 (T2) football match and WDSF until ceased on 8 June 2018 along with True Sport 1.

Sport rights

Football

American Football

Basketball

Motorsport

Tennis

Muay Thai

Mixed Martial Arts

References

External links

Charoen Pokphand
True Corporation
Television stations in Thailand
Sports television networks